Giru Mons is an ancient town of the Roman Empire and a titular bishopric of the Roman Catholic Church. The ancient town has been tentatively identified with ruins at Yerroum, northern Algeria.

Giru Mons was the capital of a historic diocese in the Roman province of Mauretania Caesariensis, which ceased to function in the 7th century during the Islamic expansion, into northern Algeria. The only known ancient bishop of this diocese is Reparato, who took part in the synod assembled in Carthage in 484 by King Huneric of the Vandal Kingdom, after which Reparato was exiled. At present the Catholic bishops are titular.

Known bishops
Reparato  (fl.484)
 Donaldo Chávez Núñez   Auxiliary Bishop in Managua (Nicaragua)   February 15, 1966 – 1979  
 Antony Selvanayagam  Auxiliary Bishop in Kuala Lumpur (Malaysia)   6 March 1980 – 2 July 1983  
 Stefan Moskwa   Auxiliary Bishop in Przemyśl (Poland)   30 November 1983 – 18 October 2004  
 Giambattista Diquattro Titular archbishop pro hac vice  Apostolic Nuncio  2 April 2005

References

Archaeological sites in Algeria
Catholic titular sees in Africa
Ancient Berber cities
Roman towns and cities in Mauretania Caesariensis